Xyleborinus exiguus, is a species of weevil widely distributed throughout the Old World tropics and introduced to African and South American countries.

Distribution
It is native to India, Andaman Islands, Sri Lanka, Cambodia, China, Laos, Myanmar, Nepal, Taiwan, Thailand, Vietnam, Australia, Cook Islands, Micronesia, Fiji, Guam, Indonesia, Malaysia, Mariana Islands, New Guinea, Niue Island, Philippines, Samoa, Solomon Islands, Tahiti. It is also introduced to West African countries such as Angola, Cameroon, Congo, Equatorial Guinea, Gabon, Ghana, Ivory Coast, Zaire as well as in Central American countries: Costa Rica, and Panamá.

Description
This small, elongate-cylindrical beetle is about 1.8 to 2.0 mm long. This weevil can be identified by the declivital face with interstriae 2 which is unarmed by tubercles. Elytral apex is attenuate, with three pairs of large flattened tubercles. The declivital interstriae is flat, and the interstriae 2 is not impressed.

A polyphagous species, it is found from many host plants.

Host plants
 Afzelia
 Anacardium excelsum
 Anthocleista nobilis
 Artocarpus
 Bombax malabaricum
 Brosimum utile 
 Caloncoba
 Canarium euphyllum
 Cinnamomum iners
 Dipterocarpus zeylanicus
 Durio zibethinus
 Eucalyptus deglupta
 Hevea brasiliensis
 Parkia speciosa
 Pterocarpus dalbergoides 
 Quercus 
 Samanea saman
 Staudtia stipitata
 Symphonia globulifera
 Terminalia bialata
 Trichilia
 Triplochiton scleroxylon

References 

Curculionidae
Insects of Sri Lanka
Beetles described in 1896